Richard Yates Rowe (December 12, 1888 – March 19, 1973) was an American politician and businessman.

Biography
Born in Jacksonville, Illinois, Rowe served in the United States Navy during World War I. He received his bachelor's degree from University of Illinois at Urbana–Champaign. He worked in the insurance and newspaper businesses. Rowe was a Republican. In 1944, Rowe was appointed Illinois Secretary of State to fill a vacancy and then in 1946 was elected Illinois State Treasurer. His son was Harris Rowe who served in the Illinois House of Representatives. Rowe died in Jacksonville, Illinois on March 19, 1973.

Notes

1888 births
1973 deaths
Politicians from Jacksonville, Illinois
Military personnel from Illinois
University of Illinois Urbana-Champaign alumni
Businesspeople from Illinois
Illinois Republicans
State treasurers of Illinois
Secretaries of State of Illinois
20th-century American politicians
20th-century American businesspeople